In Christian theology, a sodality, also known as a syndiakonia, is a form of the "Universal Church" expressed in specialized, task-oriented form as opposed to the Christian church in its local, diocesan form (which is termed modality). In English, the term sodality is most commonly used by groups in the Anglican Communion, Catholic Church, Eastern Orthodox Church, Lutheran Church and Reformed Church, where they are also referred to as confraternities. Sodalities are expressed among Protestant Churches through the multitude of mission organizations, societies, and specialized ministries that have proliferated, particularly since the advent of the modern missions movement, usually attributed to Englishman William Carey in 1792.

In many Christian denominations, "modality" refers to the structure and organization of the local or universal church, composed of pastors or priests. By contrast, parachurch organizations are termed sodalities. These include missionary organizations and Christian charities or fraternities not linked to specific churches. Some theologians would include denominations, schools of theology, and other multi-congregational efforts in the sodality category. Sodalities can also include religious orders, monasteries, and convents.

Origins of sodalities 
The Latin word sodalis means "companion", a sodality being an organization of companions or friends.
The sodalities of the Church are pious associations and are included among the confraternities and archconfraternities. Joseph Hilgers, writing in the Catholic Encyclopedia, states that it would not be possible to give a definition making a clear distinction between the sodalities and other confraternities. Confraternities and sodalities had their beginnings after the rise of the confraternities of prayer in the early Middle Ages (around 400–1000 AD), and developed rapidly from the end of the 12th century, with the rise of the great ecclesiastical orders, such as the Dominicans, the Carmelites, and the Servites. Other associations of this kind soon appeared under the jurisdiction of the local ordinary and had no particular connection with a religious order.

The British historian and social writer, William Lecky (1880), notes that around 1200 AD:
"Christianity for the first time made charity a rudimentary virtue, giving it a leading place in the moral type, and in the exhortation of its teachers. Besides its general influence in stimulating the affections, it effected a complete revolution in this sphere, by regarding the poor as the special representatives of the Christian Founder, and thus making the love of Christ, rather than the love of man the principle of charity... A vast organization of charity, presided over by Bishops, and actively directed by the deacons, soon ramified over Christendom, till the bond of charity became the bond of unity, and the most distant sections of the Christian Church corresponded by the interchange of mercy."

The quote above reflects the start of organized charitable work in the Christian world in the Middle Ages. It was a major break in theological thinking and it was brokered by the Catholic Church. Prior to this acts of charity were usually small and ad hoc, and aimed at specific needy members of the community. Thus, the Catholic Church became involved and motivated for intervention on religious grounds. Various organisations sprang up that were aimed at helping and evangelising the poor and supporting other groups within the Church. These organisations were the first sodalities that were aimed at good deeds and charitable work.

During the Middle Ages, many of these pious associations placed themselves under the special protection of the Blessed Virgin and chose her as their patron. The main object and duty of these societies were, above all, the practice of piety and works of charity. By the end of the Middle Ages (around 1400 AD), the Church experienced a crisis and lost power and influence. Two hundred years later, in the 16th century, the Church rose to renewed prosperity and the many new religious congregations and associations gave birth to numerous new confraternities and sodalities which worked with great success and, in some cases, still exist.

Classes of sodalities 

A useful way to understand sodalities, and their place in the Christian Church, is to divide the sodalities, pious associations and confraternities into three broad types:

Type A 

This group includes the confraternities which seek mainly to attain piety, devotion and the increase of love of God by special devotion to God, the Blessed Virgin, the angels, or the saints. In the first half of the twentieth century, such sodalities were the mainstay of Catholic parish life in many countries.

Type B 

This group consists of sodalities which are founded to promote the spiritual works of mercy (i.e. faith related aspects) and corporal works of mercy (i.e. the needs of the body) The table below presents the original examples of each work of mercy which would have been applicable to sodalities in the 16th Century.

Spiritual Works of Mercy: Instructing the ignorant, counseling the doubtful, admonishing sinners, bearing wrongs patiently, forgiving offences willingly, comforting the afflicted, and praying for the living and the dead.

Corporal Works of Mercy: Feeding the hungry, giving drink to the thirsty, clothing the naked, harbouring the harbourless, visiting the sick, ransoming the captive, and burying the dead.

Type C 

This group comprises those associations of the Christian Church where the main object is the well-being and improvement of various groupings of people, such as men, women and children, or more specifically, priests, youth, church helpers, prisoners, immigrants, nurses, married people, couples, etc.

The above figure shows these three types of sodalities in relation to the Church and the broader community. Type A is wholly contained with the Church, while Types B and C have activities that impact on the community outside the Church. They do share some commonalities.

When looking at the categories above it is easy to see why there is some confusion surrounding the roles and definition of a sodality. A sodality has come to be regarded differently by different people: 
 It could promote the love and worship of God; 
 It could be a way of evangelizing the Church;
 It could be aimed at aiding certain groups within the Church; and 
 It could be a social group which gets together for companionship and to do good deeds.

A simplified definition 

Another way of determining a usable definition of a sodality is to look at the anthropological uses of the terms “sodality” and “modality.” The anthropological use of these terms was introduced to the Church by Ralph D. Winter in 1971:

Winter said that modality is a Church with a hierarchy and vertical structure that has people of all ages and stages of life who are involved in the life of the Church at many levels. Some people are very committed, while others due to life stages, beliefs, and choice are nominally involved (J. Clark. Missional Communities. 2003).

Sodalities on the other hand are much more narrowly focused. They are usually very task and relationally focused, where belonging to the community means deep and multiple commitments. It is almost impossible to be a nominal part of a sodality as they define themselves by high commitment levels.

According to Rene Metz, "Canon law provides for and favours pious associations of lay people...The best-known of the confraternities is that of the Most Blessed Sacrament. (p. 93)".

See also

 Adelphopoiesis, Greek Christian brother making.
Apostolate
Confraternity of priests
Sodality of Our Lady

References

External links
Catholic Encyclopedia: Confraternities (Sodalities)
Sodality of Mary, Mother of Priests
Brotherhood of the Holy Thorn
 The Sodality of the Holy Spirit, (Anglican)
 Sodality of the Sacred Heart of Jesus, Catholic Archdiocese of Johannesburg
 Holy Souls Sodality, Association of Marian Helpers

Confraternities
Ecclesiology